Afa Ismail (born 1 November 1993 in Malé) is a Maldivian sprinter. She competed in the 100 metres competition at the 2012 Summer Olympics and 200 metres event for the Maldives at the 2016 Summer Olympics in Rio de Janeiro. She was the flag bearer for the Maldives during the closing ceremony.

She is the current national record holder in the 200 metres and the 4×100 metres relay.

Achievements

Personal bests
100 metres – 12.32 
200 metres – 24.96 (Rio 2016) NR

National titles
3 Times Renewed 200 Meters National Record - 2011, 15, 16
3 Times National Athletics Tournament Overall Best Female Athlete - 2012, 13, 14
4 Times National 200 Meters Champion - 2012, 13, 14, 16
5 Times National Long Jump Champion - 2011, 12, 13, 14, 16
3 Times National 100 Meters Champion - 2012, 13, 14

References

External links
 
 

1993 births
Living people
Maldivian female sprinters
Olympic athletes of the Maldives
Athletes (track and field) at the 2012 Summer Olympics
Athletes (track and field) at the 2016 Summer Olympics
Athletes (track and field) at the 2010 Asian Games
World Athletics Championships athletes for the Maldives
Asian Games competitors for the Maldives
Olympic female sprinters